Graham Calder is a Scottish rugby union player, formerly of Glasgow Warriors at professional level and Heriots, Peebles, Currie,  and Stirling County and currently at Dalziel. Calder plays at Scrum-Half but can also cover at Fly-Half.

Amateur career

Calder started his rugby career at Dalziel RFC before moving to Heriots, Peebles, Currie, and Stirling County.

He was part of the Glasgow Thistles squad in season 1999-2000. The Thistles were used as an academy side by Glasgow Warriors and sent to New Zealand for rugby training.

Calder is now at Dalziel.

Professional career

In season 2005-06, Calder joined Glasgow Warriors on a trial.

A knee injury in the first game of the season to Sam Pinder against Ayr RFC meant that Calder was called upon almost immediately. Coach Hugh Campbell said "He fitted in very well considering he had met up with the team only tonight."

Although Glasgow Warriors won the match 40 - 10 and his performance was praised, it was Calder's only appearance for the Warriors.

Festival Director

Calder now runs the annual Festival of Youth Rugby in Dalziel. The festival showcases youth rugby in Scotland, although youth teams from Northern Ireland and England also take part as guest touring teams. The tournament annually attracts around a thousand boys and girls.

The festival was started in 1991 by Graham Calder's father Alan Calder. The Alan Calder trophy is handed out to the Under 18 winners. Alan Calder died in 2008 but is still remembered as a Dalziel RFC legend, having previously been club captain and president.

The festival celebrated its silver anniversary in 2015. Since 2016 the Festival of Youth Rugby plays its matches on all-weather parks.

Calder stated: "Over the years we’ve seen the playing fields and facilities here at Dalziel evolve to become among the very best in Scotland. It’s fitting the 26th festival action will be played on the brand new all-weather parks, marking that progress. Where the landscape has changed, one thing that’s always remained a constant here is the spirit of rugby. The festival brings all hands to the pump, and the teamwork and the sense of fun and camaraderie has been the very lifeblood of the event since 1991."

Former Dalziel and Glasgow Warriors players like Gary Strain and Brian Robertson support the event.

References

External links
Festival of Youth Rugby in Dalziel - Daily Record

Living people
Scottish rugby union players
Glasgow Warriors players
Peebles RFC players
Stirling County RFC players
Currie RFC players
Dalziel RFC players
Heriot's RC players
Year of birth missing (living people)
Rugby union scrum-halves